The 2010 Mindanao earthquakes occurred in the southern Philippines in the Moro Gulf. This was a complex sequence of events including three main events (a triplet earthquake) of  magnitude 7.3 or greater on the 23rd of July, and two significant aftershocks of magnitude 6.6 on the 24th and 29th. This resulted in minimal, but very widespread shaking at the surface, with a maximum intensity of IV (Moderately strong) on the PEIS scale; consequently there were no reports of casualties or damage.

Tectonic summary
The southern part of the Philippines lies above the complex collisional zone between the Philippine Sea Plate and the Sunda Plate. The convergence between these two plates of between 6–11 cm per year is accommodated by a series of smaller plates.  One of these, the Molucca Sea Plate, is currently being subducted beneath both the Philippine Sea Plate and the Sangihe Microplate, causing it to have an inverted U-shape seismic zone. The earthquakes were caused by the continuing distortion of the Molucca Sea Plate. These three quakes of similar magnitude occurring in such close proximity of each other location-wise and time-wise can be regarded as an example of a triplet earthquake.

Areas affected
These earthquakes occurred in Moro Gulf, off the island of Mindanao. The  7.6 earthquake were felt in Philippines, Taiwan, and Malaysia. The  7.4 earthquake were felt in Philippines, Brunei, Malaysia, and Indonesia.

See also
List of earthquakes in 2010
List of earthquakes in the Philippines

References

External links
 

Mindanao Earthquakes, 2010
Mindanao earthquakes, 2010
2010 in the Philippines
July 2010 events in the Philippines
Earthquakes in the Philippines
Earthquake clusters, swarms, and sequences